KMLB (540 AM) is a commercial radio station broadcasting a talk radio format. Licensed to Monroe, Louisiana, the station is owned by Holladay Broadcasting.  All programming is simulcast on FM translator K289CG at 105.7 MHz.

Studios are located in Monroe, and its transmitter site is in nearby West Monroe, Louisiana. KMLB operates with 4,000 watts by day, using a non-directional antenna, covering parts of Louisiana, Arkansas and Mississippi.  But because AM 540 is a clear-channel frequency reserved for Canada and Mexico, the station must drastically reduce power at night to 26 watts.

Programming

Most of KMLB's schedule is made up of nationally syndicated conservative talk shows, including Rick and Bubba, Moon Griffon, Rush Limbaugh, Sean Hannity, Dave Ramsey, Michael Savage, and Coast to Coast AM with George Noory.  Weekends feature Kim Komando, Bill Cunningham, Ben Ferguson, Bill Handel and Somewhere in Time with Art Bell.  Most hours begin with world and national news from ABC News Radio.

History
The station first signed on, as KNOE, on October 4, 1944, at 1230 kHz.  It was founded by former Governor of Louisiana James A. Noe.

In November 1948, the Federal Communications Commission (FCC) approved a frequency shift for KNOE from 1230 to 1390 kHz with a concurrent increase in power from 250 watts to 5,000 watts. At that time, the station was an NBC Red Network affiliate.  On September 27, 1953, the station signed on a TV station, Channel 8 KNOE-TV.  On January 9, 1967, 101.9 WNOE-FM (now KMVX) came on the air.

Noe's son, James Albert "Jimmie" Noe Jr., ran KNOE for almost four decades, along with its FM and TV sister stations.  When Jimmie Noe died from cancer in 2005, the remaining family members agreed to place the stations up for sale and exit broadcasting. 

On March 6, 2007, the station announced extensive programming changes, moving Rush Limbaugh to KNOE and adding new programming.  According to the news story, KMLB, then at 1440 AM, would be a "general interest talk" station while 540 KNOE would become a "political talk" station.

In November 2006, the Noe family reached an agreement to sell KNOE to Clay Holladay's Holladay Broadcasting; the following year, its other stations would be sold, with KNOE-FM sold to another Holladay subsidiary, Radio Monroe; and KNOE-TV sold to Hoak Media Corporation.
This sales agreement placed KNOE and KMLB (1440 AM) under common ownership. The FCC placed a restriction on the sale that: "This grant is subject to the following condition: Consummation of this transaction is subject to the prior or concurrent cancellation of the license for KMLB(AM), Monroe, Louisiana (Facility ID #48636)".

All programming was consolidated on 540 AM from 1440 AM. The original KMLB on 1440 AM was taken off the air, with its license surrendered to the FCC on March 4, 2008. Thirteen days later, the call letters on 540 AM were changed from KNOE to KMLB.

Notable hosts 
 Rob Redding
 Moon Griffon

References

External links

Radio Locator Information for K289CG

Radio stations in Louisiana
Mass media in Monroe, Louisiana
Talk radio stations in the United States
Radio stations established in 1944
1944 establishments in Louisiana
The Radio People radio stations